Prince Regent was launched at Howdon Pans in 1811, the last vessel that the shipbuilding firm of Francis Hurry & Co. built. She spent almost all her career as a West Indiaman. New owners circa 1834 started trading with the Baltic. She was wrecked on 31 October 1836, forcing her crew to abandon her.

Career
Prince Regent first appeared in Lloyd's Register (LR) in 1812.

She was registered in Liverpool in 1818

Fate
On 31 October 1836, Prince Regent, Lane, master, was wrecked on her way back from Riga to London. Her crew abandoned her as she had nine feet of water in her hold. She had been driven ashore at "Wettsa", Russia.

Her entry in the volume of Lloyd's Register for 1836 carried the annotation "Abandoned".

Notes

Citations

1811 ships
Age of Sail merchant ships of England
Maritime incidents in October 1836